Tubipora hemprichi is an organ coral in the family Tubiporidae. It was first described in 1834 by Christian Gottfried Ehrenberg. The species name honours Wilhelm Hemprich, and was described from a specimen found in the Red Sea.

The species is marine and requires a hard surface to grow on.

References

Tubiporidae
Corals described in 1834
Taxa named by Christian Gottfried Ehrenberg